O7 may refer to:
 O7 star, a subclass of O-type stars
 LNER Class O7, a class of British steam locomotives 
 O7, the IATA airline designator for OzJet
 o7, an emoticon for a person saluting
 O-7, a pay grade in the US uniformed services:
 Brigadier General in the Army, Marine Corps, Air Force, and Space Force
 Rear admiral (lower half) in the Navy, Coast Guard, Public Health Service Commissioned Corps, and NOAA Commissioned Officer Corps

See also

 07 (disambiguation)
 7O (disambiguation)
 o07 (disambiguation)